Back belts, or lumbar support belts, are generally lightweight belts worn around the lower back to provide support to the lumbar. Industrial back belts tend to be similar to weight lifting belts or special belts used in medical rehabilitation therapy. Back belts are popular among workers across a number of industries—airline baggage handlers, warehouse workers, piano movers, grocery clerks, etc.—specifically to prevent lifting injuries.

The theory underlying the use of back belts is that the belts reduce forces on the spine, stiffen the spine, or increase intra-abdominal pressure. Research has yet to demonstrate the efficacy of back belts in preventing ergonomic injuries, although some research has suggested that back belts may have some effect in stabilizing the spine when lifting objects. In some cases, workers expose themselves to greater risk of injury, believing that the back belt is providing extra support and protection.

See also
Back brace
Passive exoskeleton

References 

Ergonomics